Alex Young (born October 17, 1989) is an American professional basketball player for Sharjah of the UAE National Basketball League. He played college basketball for the IUPUI Jaguars before playing professionally in Italy, Israel, France, Russia and China.

Early life and college career
Young attended Northwest High School in Indianapolis, Indiana, where he was the 2008 Indianapolis City and Indianapolis Public Schools Player of the Year. Young averaged 18.6 points and 13.7 rebounds per game as a senior, ranking third in the state in rebounding, shooting 52.7 percent from the floor and 34.3 percent from three-point range in his final season.

Young played college basketball for IUPUI's Jaguars, where he led the Jaguars in scoring (20.4 ppg), rebounding (5.9 rpg), blocks (32), steals (50), threes made (59) and free throws made (156). Young was named three-time First team All-Summit League, two-time First team NABC All-District (12) and Summit League All-Tournament Team.

Professional career

Capo d'Orlando (2012–2013)
After going undrafted in the 2012 NBA draft, Young joined the Sacramento Kings for the 2012 NBA Summer League.

On August 10, 2012, Young started his professional career with Capo d'Orlando of the Italian Serie A2, signing a one-year deal.

Sigma Barcellona (2013–2014)
On July 8, 2013, Young joined the Golden State Warriors for the 2013 NBA Summer League.

On July 22, 2013, Young signed with Sigma Barcellona for the 2013–2014 season. On January 5, 2014, Young recorded a season-high 35 points, shooting 12-of-18 from the field, along with five rebounds and two steals in an 82–95 loss to Veroli Basket.

Hapoel Gilboa Galil (2014–2015)
On August 1, 2014, Young signed with the Israeli team Hapoel Gilboa Galil for the 2014–15 season. On March 3, 2015, Young participated in the Israeli League All-Star game.

Châlons-Reims (2015–2017)
On July 28, 2015, Young signed a two-year deal with the French team Châlons-Reims. On December 17, 2016, Young recorded a season-high 33 points, shooting 8-of-10 from 3-point range, along with three rebounds and four steals in an 84–89 loss to Orléans Loiret Basket.

Ironi Nahariya (2017–2018)
On July 17, 2017, Young returned to Israel for a second stint, signing with Ironi Nahariya for the 2017–18 season. In October 2017, Young helped Nahariya to reach the 2017 Israeli League Cup Final, where they eventually lost to Maccabi Tel Aviv. On November 2, 2017, Young was named Israeli League Player of the Month for games played in October. On November 18, 2017, Young recorded a season-high 36 points, along with seven rebounds, three assists and three steals in an 88–92 loss to Maccabi Rishon LeZion. On May 17, 2018, Young scored 15 points, including a game-winning 3-pointer in a 77–76 win over Maccabi Ashdod that helped Nahariya to secure their place in the Israeli Premier League for another season.

Enisey (2018–2019)
On July 11, 2018, Young signed a one-year deal with the Russian team Enisey of the VTB United League.

Beijing Ducks (2019)
On May 24, 2019, Young signed with the Beijing Ducks for the 2019 NBL season. On July 17, 2019, Young recorded a double-double of 11 rebounds and a career-high 54 points, shooting 11-of-22 from three-point range, along with three assists in a 108–132 loss to the Guangxi Rhino.

Al Ahly (2019–2020)
On July 24, 2019, Young signed a one-year deal with Al Ahly of the Egyptian Super League.

Sharjah (2021–present)
On September 23, 2021, Young was announced by Sharjah of the UAE National Basketball League.

Career statistics

Domestic Leagues

|-
| style="text-align:center;" | 2012–13
| style="text-align:left;" rowspan=1| Orlandina
| style="text-align:center;" rowspan=2| Serie A2
|| 16 || 29.9 || .447 || .284 || .680 || 5.5 || 1.1 || 1.8 || .4 || 19.5
|-
| style="text-align:center;" | 2013–14
| style="text-align:left;" rowspan=1| Barcellona
|| 34 || 33.0 || .473 || .360 || .787 || 6.4 || .7 || 1.3 || .5 || 19.5
|-
| style="text-align:center;" | 2014–15
| style="text-align:left;" rowspan=1| Gilboa Galil
| style="text-align:center;" rowspan=1| IPL
|| 32  || 29.5 || .403 || .310 || .766 || 5.4 || 2.0 || 1.1 || .6 || 15.5
|-
| style="text-align:center;" | 2015–16
| style="text-align:left;" rowspan=2| Châlons-Reims
| style="text-align:center;" rowspan=2| Pro A
|| 34 || 28.7 || .434 || .331 || .782 || 4.4 || 1.3 || 1.3 || .3 || 14.3
|-
| style="text-align:center;" | 2016–17
|| 32 || 28.9 || .433 || .370 || .727 || 3.5 || 1.4 || 1 || .5 || 14.8
|-
| style="text-align:center;" | 2017–18
| style="text-align:left;" rowspan=1| Nahariya
| style="text-align:center;" rowspan=1| IPL
|| 33  || 33.3 || .444 || .294 || .769 || 5.3 || 2.2 || 2.1 || .7 || 17.0
|-
| style="text-align:center;" | 2018–19
| style="text-align:left;" rowspan=1| Enisey
| style="text-align:center;" rowspan=1| VTB
|| 18  || 26.2 || .407 || .338 || .690 || 3.9 || 1.4 || 1.1 || .1 || 12.1
|-
| style="text-align:center;" | 2019
| style="text-align:left;" rowspan=1| Beijing Ducks
| style="text-align:center;" rowspan=1| NBL
|| 14 || 38.5 || .506 || .312 || .741 || 7.4 || 4.1 || 1.7 || .6 || 32.6
|-
|}
Source: RealGM & Eurobasket

References

External links
 IUPUI Jaguars bio
 Eurobasket profile
 RealGM profile

1989 births
Living people
American expatriate basketball people in China
American expatriate basketball people in France
American expatriate basketball people in Israel
American expatriate basketball people in Italy
American expatriate basketball people in Russia
American men's basketball players
Basketball players from Indianapolis
BC Enisey players
Beijing Ducks players
Hapoel Gilboa Galil Elyon players
Ironi Nahariya players
IUPUI Jaguars men's basketball players
Orlandina Basket players
Reims Champagne Basket players
Shooting guards
Small forwards
Sharjah SC basketball players